Microphone Champion is the second studio album by English grime MC Skepta, released on 1 June 2009. It includes the single "Too Many Man" featuring Boy Better Know, also featured on Wiley's own album, Race Against Time, and Shorty's "Short Man Syndrome".

Singles
 "Rolex Sweep" is the first single from the album. It was released on 15 September 2008; it reached number 89 on the UK Singles Chart.
 "Sunglasses at Night", a non-album track, was released as a single on 16 March 2009;. It reached number 64 on the UK Singles Chart.
 "Too Many Man", featuring fellow artists from Boy Better Know, is the second single from the album. It was released on 18 May 2009; it reached number 79 on the UK Singles Chart.
 "Lush", featuring Jay Sean, is the third and final single from the album. It was released on 12 October 2009.

Track listing

Notes
 The bonus tracks "Rolex Sweep" and "Sunglasses at Night" are only available on the CD version of the album.

Sample credits
 "Over the Top" contains samples of "Top Billin'", written and performed by Audio Two.

Release history

References

External links
Ukrecordshop.com
Skepta's involvement in grime. What is grime?

2009 albums
Skepta albums